Faymonville Group is a trailer and heavy transport equipment manufacturer operating worldwide. Started back in the 1960s in Rocherath, Belgium as a blacksmith shop later started to manufacture and sell agriculture machines and tractor cabins in 1962 opened a new production unit to fulfill the demand of forestry vehicles. In the late 1960s, the company manufactured its first semi-trailer. Today it manufactures every type of trailer for different transportation needs, ranging from flatbeds to SPMTs. With 5 production facilities spread around the world in Luxembourg, Belgium, Poland, Italy and Russia while having its headquarters in Luxembourg.

With time, the group has acquired and created brands to cater different transport requirements. Faymonville group developed Max trailer brand in 2012 to cater basic transportation needs. In 2017 Faymonville group acquired Cometto which is a leading player in SPMT and industry transporter manufacturing. With Faymonville as primary brand.

History 
The brand started as a blacksmith shop in a village, Rocherath, Belgium. Later developed a manufacturing unit for sale and production of agriculture equipments and tractor cabins. In late 1960 the company manufactured its first semi-trailer, having the large number of glass manufacturers motivated the growth of the brand and their first low bed trailer in 1973 for transporting glass. Looking for a solution to transport glass panes vertically, they developed a special inloader trailer in 1977. In 1980 the first extendable trailer with hydraulic steering was manufactured by the company.

With ever so growing demand, the old manufacturing unit could not compensate. For the same reason, in 1988 a new unit was built in Büllingen, Belgium. Which could handle higher demand and production. Since then, the product line was expanding to meet new needs of customers. New production units were added in 2003 in Luxembourg, 2006 in Poland and a CKD assembly unit in Moscow.

Brands 

 MAX trailer
 Faymonville
 Cometto

MAX trailers 
MAX Trailer brand is developed by the Faymonville Group in 2012 for basic transport need and transporting payload of 15 to 60 tons, having 2 to 6 axles. The range includes normal trailers, semi-trailer, lowbed trailers and flatbed trailers.

Products 
 MAX100
 MAX200
 MAX300
 MAX410
 MAX510
 MAX600

Faymonville 

Faymonville brand is specialized in manufacturing and selling specialized and unconventional trailers for oversize load transportation, which can handle 60 to 500 ton of payload. The brand is well around the world for its extendable trailers and hydraulic modular trailersProducts

Global 
 MegaMAX
 GigaMAX
 VarioMAX
 VarioMAX Plus
 MultiMAX
 MultiMAX Plus
 ModulMAX
 CombiMAX
 TeleMAX
 CargoMAX
 TimberMAX
 FlexMAX
 FloatMAX
 PrefaMAX

North America 

 MegaMAX-US
 TeleMAX-US
 MultiMAX-US
 HighwayMAX
 DualMAX

Cometto 

Started in 1954 as workshop for vehicles, bridge cranes and systems in the name of Officine Cometto at Cuneo, Italy. With constant growth, the company became a major manufacturer of industry transporter. Some remarkable transporters build by Cometto include 1100 ton capacity SPMT for Hyundai Heavy Industries and 3000 ton capacity SPMT for Nippon Express, which is till date its largest transporter ever built.

Products 
 MSPE
 ECO1000/1500
 ModulMAX SP-E
 BladeMAX
 SYT
 ETH/ETL
 MTH

See also 

 SPMT
 Hydraulic modular trailer
 Heavy Hauler
 Goldhofer
 Transporter Industry International

References 

1960 establishments in Belgium
Luxembourgian companies established in 1960
Trailer manufacturing companies
Heavy haulage